Tuctoria greenei is a species of grass endemic to California. Its common names include awnless spiralgrass and Greene's tuctoria. It is included by the California Native Plant Society on list 1B.1 (rare, threatened, or endangered). It is also listed by the state of California as rare and by the Federal Government as endangered, having been federally listed on March 26, 1997.

This grass typically occurs in vernal pools in open grassland on the eastern side of the Sacramento and San Joaquin Valleys. This endangered species is threatened by the destruction of its already rare vernal pool habitat. Processes causing this habitat destruction include agriculture, urban development, overgrazing and trampling by livestock, alterations in hydrology, and introduced species.

References

External links
Jepson Manual Treatment
Photo gallery

Chloridoideae
Native grasses of California
Endemic flora of California
Bunchgrasses of North America
Natural history of the Central Valley (California)